Johan Mårten Eliel Soisalon-Soininen (born Johnsson, raised to the nobility as Soisalon-Soininen; 26 May 1856 – 6 February 1905) was a Finnish Chancellor of Justice.

Johnsson was born in Pielisjärvi, and graduated from the Kuopion lyseon lukio (in Kuopio) on 5 June 1875. He obtained his law degree in 1879. Johnsson worked in the Vyborg Courts of Appeal from 1879. He served as reserve judge in 1882. Soisalon-Soininen worked at the senate's justice apartment from 1900 and from 1901 to 1905 as chancellor of justice. Soisalon-Soininen was assassinated in 1905 when a young student called Lennart Hohenthal murdered him at his apartment in Helsinki.

In the morning at 10.30 AM a young man of a heavy build (Hohenthal) dressed as a Russian officer came to Soisalon-Soininen's apartment in Helsinki. Having deceived the police posted outside, Hohenthal rang the doorbell and a valet, in fact a disguised policeman, opened the door. Hohenthal gave the valet a business card which read Alexander De Gadd, Lieutenant de la Garde, St. Petersbourg. Hohenthal asked if he could meet the chancellor. The valet guided him to the chancellor's office.

When Soisalon-Soininen came to the room, Hohenthal pulled a pistol and shot eight shots towards the chancellor of justice, two of which struck the chancellor in the chest and stomach.

The chancellor of justice fell to the floor. Then the valet entered the room and shot at the assassin. During the exchange of fire between the assassin and policeman, the 17-year-old Johan (a.k.a. Juhani) who was the son of Soisalon-Soininen came to the room and joined the policeman in firing upon the assassin.

Hohenthal shot Johan in the leg. Hohenthal also received some small injuries and surrendered. He was taken to hospital under guard.

References

External links 
 
 Soisalon-Soininen, Eliel at Uppslagsverket Finland (in Swedish).

1856 births
1905 deaths
People from Lieksa
People from Kuopio Province (Grand Duchy of Finland)
Finnish nobility
Finnish Party politicians
Finnish senators
19th-century Finnish lawyers
University of Helsinki alumni
Assassinated Finnish politicians
People murdered in Finland
Deaths by firearm in Finland
Swedish-speaking Finns